Taruma (Taruamá) is a divergent language of northeastern South America. It has been reported to be extinct several times since as far back as 1770, but Eithne Carlin discovered the last three speakers living in Maruranau among the Wapishana, and is documenting the language.  The people and language are known as Saluma in Suriname.

Classification
Taruma is unclassified.  It has been proposed to be distantly related to Katembri (Kaufman 1990), but this relationship has not been repeated in recent surveys of South American languages (Campbell 2012).

History
Taruma was spoken around the mouth of the Rio Negro during the late 1600s, but the speakers later moved to southern Guyana. In the 1940s, the Taruma tribe were reported to no longer exist as a distinct group. However, their presence has recently been confirmed in the Wapishana village of Marunarau, where they are recognized as a distinct tribe.

Language contact
Jolkesky (2016) notes that there are lexical similarities with the Chibchan, Katukina-Katawixi, Arawak, Jeoromitxi, Tupi, Arawa, Jivaro, Karib, Mura-Matanawi, Tukano, Yanomami, and Kwaza language families due to contact.

The following table illustrates some of the aforementioned borrowing situations:

{| class="wikitable sortable"
! gloss !! Taruma !! Damana (Chibchan) !! Katukina !! Wapishana (Arawakan) !! Arikapu !! Proto-Tupian !! Proto-Arawan !! Proto-Jivaroan !! Proto-Cariban !! Mura !! Proto-Tucanoan
|-
| father || aide || ade || - || - || - || - || - || - || - || - || -
|-
| sister || aʧi || asi || - || - || - || - || - || - || - || - || -
|-
| mouth || kukana || kəka || - || - || - || - || - || - || - || - || -
|-
| bird || zuri || suri || - || - || - || - || - || - || - || - || -
|-
| snake || báhũ || - || paɡo || - || - || - || - || - || - || - || -
|-
| wood || u || - || -ʔu || - || - || - || - || - || - || - || -
|-
| tick || piʤíʤi || - || piːʧiN || - || - || - || - || - || - || - || -
|-
| tobacco || suma || - || uːba || suuma || - || - || - || - || - || - || -
|-
| bow || kobara || - || - || sumara || - || - || - || - || - || - || -
|-
| star || wire || - || - || wiiʐi || - || - || - || - || - || - || -
|-
| go || maku || - || - || makʰu-n || - || - || - || *maku 'leg' || - || - || -
|-
| monkey || rumi || - || - || ruumi || - || - || - || - || - || - || -
|-
| worm || pararu || - || - || pʰaʐaru || - || - || - || - || - || - || -
|-
| egg || dani || - || - || ʤani || - || - || - || - || - || - || -
|-
| chest || duku || - || - || ɗukʰuri || - || - || - || - || - || - || -
|-
| flea || kuwaba || - || - || kʰuwaiɓa || - || - || - || - || - || - || -
|-
| caiman || hiri || - || - || - || uhiri || - || - || - || - || - || -
|-
| deer || konia || - || - || - || kudi || - || - || - || - || - || -
|-
| dance (v.) || kabihwi || - || - || - || kəwi || - || - || - || - || - || -
|-
| eat || ko || - || - || - || - || *kˀu || - || - || - || - || -
|-
| path || afe || - || - || - || - || *ape || - || - || - || - || -
|-
| arrow || kupa || - || - || - || - || *ekʷˀɨp || - || - || - || - || -
|-
| salt || wuka || - || - || - || - || *wukɨt || - || - || - || - || -
|-
| deer || hiʧi || - || - || - || - || *ɨʧɨ || - || - || - || - || -
|-
| axe || bade || - || - || - || - || - || *bari || - || - || - || -
|-
| wild dog || hi || - || - || - || - || - || *-hi || - || - || - || -
|-
| forest || nukuda || - || - || - || - || - || *nuku 'mountain' || - || - || - || -
|-
| peccary || baki 'tapir' || - || - || - || - || - || - || *paki || *pakira || - || -
|-
| leaf || ʤuka || - || - || - || - || - || - || *nuka || - || - || -
|-
| sweet-potato || aɸi || - || - || - || - || - || - || - || *napi || - || *jãpi 
|-
| canoe || kanawa || - || - || - || - || - || - || - || *kanawa || - || -
|-
| hand || aɸũ || - || - || - || - || - || - || - || *apô 'arm' || - || -
|-
| earth || dudu || - || - || - || - || - || - || - || *nono || - || -
|-
| poison || kʷima || - || - || - || - || - || - || - || *kuma || - || -
|-
| fire || hʷa || - || - || - || - || - || - || - || - || hũai || - 
|-
| breast || iwa || - || - || - || - || - || - || - || - || iiwe || - 
|-
| mountain || uwai || - || - || - || - || - || - || - || - || uwe 'forest' || - 
|-
| foot || apa || - || - || - || - || - || - || - || - || apai || - 
|-
| tongue || njebena || - || - || - || - || - || - || - || - || - || *tʲʔeme 
|-
| water || dja || - || - || - || - || - || - || - || - || - || *tʲʔia 'river'
|-
| three || wikʲã || - || - || - || - || - || - || - || - || - || *ɨtˀia 
|-
| woman || ɡumi- || - || - || - || - || - || - || - || - || - || *tʔõmi-
|}

Similarities with Chibchan (especially with the Magdalena and Dorasque-Changena subgroups) may be due to the former presence of Chibchan speakers in the Northeast Amazons. Similarities with Tucanoan suggest that Taruma had originated in the Caquetá basin.

Vocabulary
Loukotka (1968) lists the following basic vocabulary items.

{| class="wikitable"
! gloss !! Taruma
|-
| one || oshiwai
|-
| two || dzyowa
|-
| three || mikyahahi
|-
| head || a-dam
|-
| eye || a-tsi
|-
| man || gika
|-
| water || za
|-
| fire || fwa
|-
| sun || hwa
|-
| jaguar || dun
|-
| house || duiya
|}

For a list of Taruma words from Jolkesky (2016), see the corresponding Portuguese article.

Further reading
Meira, Sérgio. (2015). Taruma wordlist. (Manuscript).

Notes

References

 Eithne B. Carlin (2011) "Nested Identities in the Southern Guyana Surinam Corner". In Hornborg & Hill (eds.) Ethnicity in Ancient Amazonia.
 Eithne B. Carlin (2006) "Feeling the Need: The Borrowing of Cariban Functional Categories  into Mawayana (Arawak)". In Aikhenvald & Dixon (eds.) Grammars  in Contact: A Cross-Linguistic Typology, pp. 313–332. Oxford University Press.

Katembri–Taruma languages
Indigenous languages of South America
Languages of Brazil
Extinct languages of South America
Articles citing ISO change requests
Language isolates of South America